The Hangzhou Seawall Ruins Museum is an archeological site museum of seawalls located in Hangzhou, China. It is also the first seawall museum in China. It opened in Jan. 7th, 2020.

References

Further reading 

Museums in Hangzhou
Local museums in China
History museums in China